Primorsky is a rural locality (a khutor) and the administrative center of Primorskoye Rural Settlement, Kalachyovsky District, Volgograd Oblast, Russia. The population was 497 as of 2010. There are 11 streets.

Geography 
Primorsky is located 53 km south of Kalach-na-Donu (the district's administrative centre) by road. Kolpachki is the nearest rural locality.

References 

Rural localities in Kalachyovsky District